Erling Kagge (born January 15, 1963) is a Norwegian explorer, publisher, author, lawyer, art collector, entrepreneur and politician.

Three Poles Challenge 
Erling Kagge is the first person to reach the North Pole, South Pole and the summit of Mount Everest on foot.

In 1990, Erling Kagge and Børge Ousland became the first people ever to reach the North Pole unsupported. The expedition started from Ellesmere Island on March 8, 1990, and reached the North Pole 58 days later on May 4, 1990. They traveled approximately 800 kilometers on skis, pulling their supplies on sledges.

In 1992 and 1993, Kagge completed the first unsupported and solo expedition to the South Pole, covering the 814-mile (1,310 km) route in 50 days. Kagge had no radio contact to the outside world for the duration of this expedition, which was featured on the cover of the international edition of Time magazine on March 1, 1993.

In 1994, Kagge summited Mount Everest, thus becoming the first person to complete the "Three Poles Challenge" on foot.

Career
For two years, Kagge worked as a lawyer for industrial giant Norsk Hydro. Kagge has also sailed across the Atlantic twice, around Cape Horn and to the Antarctic Peninsula.

After his record-breaking feat of reaching the "three poles", Kagge attended Cambridge University to study philosophy for three terms. In 1996, he founded the eponymous Oslo-based publishing house, Kagge Forlag. In 2000 Kagge Forlag acquired one of Norway's oldest publishing companies, J.M. Stenersens Forlag. Kagge and Stenersens publish approximately 100 new titles annually. It is Norway's biggest publisher of nonfiction.

Kagge has written eight books on exploration, philosophy and art collecting, which have been translated into 39 languages. He has written for the Financial Times, The New York Times and The Guardian.

Walking
Kagge is a keen walker and continues to do expeditions, although with a lower profile than in the 1990s. In 2010 he and urban historian and photographer Steve Duncan descended into the sewers, subways and water tunnels of New York – walking for five days from the Bronx, via Manhattan, to the shore of the Atlantic Ocean. Kagge also does shorter walks: In 2012 he walked the entire length of Los Angeles' Sunset Boulevard over three days with Petter Skavlan and Peder Lund. In December 2019 Kagge, Skavlan and Lund walked the entire length of New York's Broadway – from Sleepy Hollow to the tip of Manhattan - in 24 hours.

Published works
Kagge's five most recent books are Manhattan Underground, A Poor Collectors Guide to Buying Great Art, Silence in the Age of Noise, Walking – One Step at a Time and Philosophy for Polar Explorers. Kagge's book Silence: In the Age of Noise was broadcast as BBC Radio 4's Book of the Week in January 2019. The Guardian named it one of the top ten books on silence. On Point, NPR, put Silence on their list for Best Books of 2017  and American Booksellers Association nominated it as Book of the Year, 2018. The New York Times has described Erling Kagge as "a fascinating man. He's a philosophical adventurer or perhaps an adventurous philosopher", and Financial Times identified Kagge as "something of a Renaissance man".

Kagge has been on the cover of L'Uomo Vogue.

Personal life
Kagge has three daughters: Nor, Ingrid and Solveig.

Kagge is a leading collector of international contemporary art. Four European museums have dedicated shows to his collection in recent years: Astrup Fearnley Museum for Modern Art in Oslo, Fondacion van Gogh Arles, Sala Santander in Madrid and Museion in Bolzano.

The pioneering explorer supports the Premier League club Arsenal, stating 'Over the years I've sailed the oceans, skied to the Poles, climbed the mountains and written books, but Arsenal have never been out of my thoughts'.

Bibliography 
 Kagge, Erling (1990). Nordpolen: Det siste kappløpet. J.W. Cappelens forlag. .
 Kagge, Erling (1993). Alene til Sydpolen. Cappelen. .
 Kagge, Erling (1994). Pole to Pole & Beyond. N. W. Damm & Son. .
 Kagge, Erling (2007). Philosophy for Polar Explorers: What They Don't Teach You in School. Pushkin Press. .
 Kagge, Erling (2015). A Poor Collector's Guide to Buying Great Art. Kagge Forlag
 Kagge, Erling (2015). Manhattan Underground. World Editions.
 Kagge, Erling (2017). Silence: In the Age of Noise. Pantheon. .
 Kagge, Erling (2019). Walking: One Step At a Time. Knopf Doubleday .
 Kagge, Erling (2019). Philosophy for Polar Explorers: An Adventurer´s Guide to Surviving Winter. Viking. .

References

1963 births
Living people
Explorers from Oslo
Explorers of Antarctica
Summiters of Mount Everest
Norwegian mountain climbers